Thomas Evans (5 June 1947 – 19 November 1983) was a British musician, most notable for his work with the band Badfinger. He co-wrote the song "Without You".

The Iveys 
In July 1967, the Iveys (Pete Ham, Ron Griffiths, Mike Gibbins and Dave Jenkins) went to Liverpool at the suggestion of their manager, Bill Collins, to recruit a replacement for Dave Jenkins, their rhythm guitarist and frontman. They discovered Tommy Evans singing with Them Calderstones and invited him to London to audition for the band. He eventually accepted and joined the Iveys in August 1967. His first gig with the Iveys was on 20 August 1967 at the Starlite Ballroom in Crawley.

On 23 July 1968, the Iveys were signed to the Beatles' Apple Records label. Their debut worldwide single release was "Maybe Tomorrow" which was a Tom Evans composition, written for his girlfriend in Liverpool, Leslie Sandton, who he used to date when he was a member of Them Calderstones. On 15 November 1968, "Maybe Tomorrow" b/w an Evans/Ham song "And Her Daddy's a Millionaire" was released in the UK on Apple. The US release date was 27 January 1969 (Apple 1803) and the song peaked at No. 51 on the Cash Box chart and No. 67 on the Billboard chart. In the Netherlands, it reached No. 1. It was also very successful throughout Europe and in Japan. In July 1969, this prompted the release of the Iveys' album Maybe Tomorrow being only released in those countries where the single charted high. The album was released in Japan, Italy and Germany only. The album contained the following Tom Evans compositions: "Beautiful and Blue", "Fisherman", "Maybe Tomorrow" and "Angelique".

One of the attempts at a follow-up single to "Maybe Tomorrow" was another Tom Evans composition called "Storm in a Teacup", but this was rejected and ended up being used on a promotional Apple EP for Wall's Ice Cream in July 1969.

Badfinger 
In November 1969, the Iveys changed their name to Badfinger, and Paul McCartney of the Beatles gave the group a boost by offering them his song "Come and Get It", which he produced for the band. It became a featured track for the film The Magic Christian, which starred Ringo Starr and Peter Sellers. Evans was chosen by McCartney to sing lead on this track. It reached the Top 10 worldwide. The B-side, Rock of All Ages, co-written by Evans with Pete Ham and Mike Gibbins, features Tom Evans singing lead. Paul McCartney also produced this, and even sang scratch vocals with Evans on the basic track. A third Magic Christian song, "Carry On Till Tomorrow" was co-written by Evans and Ham.

After the departure of original bassist Ron Griffiths, the band fruitlessly auditioned a replacement and with the arrival of Liverpudlian guitarist Joey Molland, Evans, who had previously played guitar, switched to bass and thus stabilised the classic line-up of Ham, Evans, Gibbins and Molland.

Badfinger enjoyed more major successes in the early 1970s with singles such as "No Matter What," "Day After Day," and "Baby Blue". Each featured some of Evans vocals; background harmony and dual lead. Evans' high-career moment was with his composition "Without You," a song co-written with bandmate Pete Ham. The song became a No. 1 hit worldwide for Harry Nilsson and has since become a standard in the music industry.

Badfinger dissolved following Ham's suicide in 1975, after which Evans joined a group called the Dodgers with Badfinger bandmate Bob Jackson. The Dodgers released three singles produced by Muff Winwood and toured Britain before recording an album, Love on the Rebound, with producer Pat Moran. Evans was eventually asked to leave the band midway through the recording sessions and he briefly retired from the music industry.

Evans resurfaced in 1977 to join Joey Molland for two Badfinger "comeback" albums. The first single of two from the first album Airwaves, was an Evans composition - "Lost Inside Your Love", but it failed to chart after its release in March 1979. The second album, Say No More spawned the Evans and Tansin single "Hold On", which reached No. 56 on the Billboard chart in 1981. Evans and Molland went their separate ways after this second album was released, and the two put together rival Badfinger touring bands in the US.

In 1982, Jackson rejoined Evans in the latter's version of Badfinger. Original Badfinger drummer Mike Gibbins was also enlisted for Evans' band for one tour. But after Evans and Jackson signed separate management contracts with a Milwaukee businessman, the trio of Evans, Gibbins and Jackson said they found themselves stranded in the US without tour dates, food, or money, and under much duress from physical threats. After returning to Britain, Evans was sued for $5 million in damages for abandoning his touring contract.

Personal life and death 
Evans was married to Marianne Evans, and together they had a son, Stephen.

Evans hanged himself in his garden on 19 November 1983, at the age of 36. He got into a dispute with former bandmate Joey Molland over royalties for the song "Without You" the previous evening.

In 1993, a compilation of recordings made in the early 1980s by Evans and musician friend Rod Roach was posthumously released in the UK on Gipsy Records under the title Over You (The Final Tracks).

Discography 
(with Badfinger, except where noted)
 Maybe Tomorrow (1969 as "The Iveys", Apple Records)
 Magic Christian Music (1970, Apple Records)
 No Dice (1970, Apple Records)
 Straight Up (1971, Apple Records)
 Ass (1973, Apple Records)
 Badfinger (1974, Warner Brothers Records)
 Wish You Were Here (1974, Warner Brothers Records)
 Airwaves (1979, Elektra Records)
 Say No More (1981, Radio Records)
 Over You: The Final Tracks (1993 as "Tom Evans with Rod Roach", Gipsy Records)
 Head First (2000, Snapper Music)
 94 Baker Street (5 tracks by the Iveys) (2003, RPM Records)
 An Apple a Day (4 tracks by the Iveys) (2006, RPM Records)
 Treacle Toffee World (2 tracks by the Iveys) (2008, RPM Records)

Evans also appeared as a guest artist on
 The Concert for Bangladesh (album)
 All Things Must Pass by George Harrison (album)
 "It Don't Come Easy" by Ringo Starr (single)
 Imagine by John Lennon (album)

Compositions of note 
 "Maybe Tomorrow" (U.S. Billboard No. 67, Cash Box No. 51 by the Iveys)
"Carry On Till Tomorrow" (album track, co-written with Pete Ham, Magic Christian Music)
 "Without You"  (Billboard No. 1 by Harry Nilsson, No. 3 by Mariah Carey, No. 28 by Clay Aiken)
"Better Days" (album track, co-written with Joey Molland, No Dice)
"I Don't Mind" (album track, co-written with Joey Molland, No Dice)
 "When I Say" (album track, Ass)
"Shine On" (album track, co-written with Pete Ham, Badfinger)
 "Lost Inside Your Love" (by Badfinger, failed to chart)
 "Hold On"  (Billboard No. 56, Cash Box No. 67 by Badfinger)

References

External links 
 Tom Evans Library
 

1947 births
English rock guitarists
English people of Welsh descent
Musicians from Liverpool
Ivor Novello Award winners
English male singer-songwriters
English rock bass guitarists
Male bass guitarists
Badfinger members
Suicides by hanging in England
Rhythm guitarists
20th-century bass guitarists
1983 suicides
20th-century British male singers